"Who Let the Dogs Out" is a song performed by Bahamian junkanoo band Baha Men. Originally released by Anslem Douglas (titled "Doggie"), it was covered by producer Jonathan King who sang it under the name Fat Jakk and his Pack of Pets. He brought the song to the attention of his friend Steve Greenberg, who then had the Baha Men cover the song. The song, released on 26 July 2000, became the band's first and only hit in the United Kingdom and the United States, and it gained popularity after appearing in Rugrats in Paris: The Movie and its soundtrack album.

"Who Let the Dogs Out" peaked at No. 2 on the UK Singles Chart, as well as topping the charts in Australia and New Zealand, and reached the Top 40 in the United States. In Britain, it was championed by DJ John Peel and went on to be the fourth biggest-selling single of 2000, and one of the highest-selling singles of the decade not to reach No. 1. The track went on to win the Grammy for Best Dance Recording at the 2001 Grammy Awards. The song became a prominent feature of Bahamian popular culture, and was the subject of a major lawsuit over copyright ownership that was settled. In 2019, an eponymous-titled documentary about the creation of the song was the surprise hit of the SXSW music festival in Austin, Texas.

Background
The song is written in the key of C major. Baha Men member Dyson Knight explained to Vice how the band came to record the song:

"Who Let The Dogs Out" is a cover of the 1998 song "Doggie" (or "Dogie") by Trinidadian calypso/soca/Junkanoo artist Anslem Douglas. Douglas himself claimed that the song has nothing to do with dogs and actually has a feminist theme. In an interview that was published on his website, he said:

However, Douglas has said "I never told anyone, 'Hey, I came up with the phrase.' Never did, 'cause I didn't." In late 1995 or early 1996 Patrick Stephenson and Leroy Williams, two producers who worked for Wreck Shop Radio out of Toronto, wrote a radio promo for WBLK in Buffalo, NY containing the "Who Let The Dogs Out" chorus. Douglas's brother-in-law was the host of the Toronto show and encouraged Douglas to record the song. Stephenson and Williams allowed Douglas to record the song and have said they didn't "take care of the business" of legally protecting the song. They did not know it was licensed to the Baha Men until they heard it on the radio in 2000.

Complicating matters further, 20 Fingers and Gillette released "You're a Dog" in 1995 with a very similar chorus where they sing, "Who let the dogs loose?" Stephenson and Williams claim to have never heard the song, and 20 Fingers has made no legal claim to "Who Let the Dogs Out?". Even earlier, Brett Hammock and Joe Gonzalez also recorded a song called "Who Let the Dogs Out?” in 1992 as rap duo Miami Boom Productions out of Jacksonville, Florida. It was not widely released, and they were also surprised to hear "Who Let The Dogs Out?" on the radio in 2000. Miami Boom states their version was inspired by "Da Mad Scientist" by Bass Patrol, in which there is a sample of 1987's "Pump Up The Party" by songwriter and producer Stevie B (released under the pseudonym Hassan) that includes the lyrics, "Who's rocking this dog's house?"

John Michael Davis from Dowagiac, Michigan contacted 99% Invisible contributor Ben Sisto. He said his hometown is sometimes referred to as "the dog patch", and the crowd at the Dowagiac Chieftains high school football games frequently chanted "Oooh, let the dogs out!” during their state championship run in 1990. During this time Joe Gonzalez of Miami Boom lived in Michigan, but he states he has no memory of hearing this chant. Sisto states that variations of the "Who let the dogs out?” chant are evident in regional high school sports, discovering a chant almost exactly like the chorus of the Baha Men song as far back as 1986 at Austin Reagan High School. Sisto surmised:

Critical reception
Daily Record commented, "If your kids have been out barking on the streets late at night, this Bahamian band are to blame with this silly Notting Hill Carnival anthem." In a 2007 poll conducted by Rolling Stone to identify the 20 most annoying songs, "Who Let the Dogs Out" ranked third. It was also ranked first on Spinner's 2008 list of "Top 20 Worst Songs Ever". Rolling Stone also ranked it at number 8 on a "worst songs of the 1990s" poll, despite the fact that the Baha Men single was released in 2000.

Commercial performance

The song was very successful in Europe and Oceania, reaching the top spot in Australia and New Zealand, number 2 in the United Kingdom (which is behind Steps's "Stomp" and Westlife's "My Love", respectively) and Ireland, the Top 5 in Sweden, Norway and the Netherlands, and the Top 10 in Germany, Switzerland, Denmark, and Belgium. It also reached number 8 in Brazil. Despite this, however, its success initially did not translate to the United States, where it peaked at number 40. It received fame after being used in the soundtrack to Rugrats in Paris: The Movie and even more so after it became a ubiquitous sports anthem at stadiums and arenas throughout the world. The song was also featured in Men in Black II, Bubble Boy, The Shaggy Dog, The Hangover, and The Christmas Chronicles 2.

Music video

In the original music video for the song, a kennel security guard is watching a game show called Who Wants to Be a Zillionaire? on TV, in which a contestant is given the title question. Dogs escape from the kennel as the emergency alarm sounds. The guard responds by yelling the title song into his walkie-talkie. Throughout the video, the dogs chase people while the band Baha Men are performing. At the end of the video, the dogs return to the kennel, pleasing the security guard.

A version also exists using the "Barking Mad Mix" of the song. This was the main video in Australia, as it was serviced to radio stations instead of the original version. A new version of the video also debuted at the end of the VHS release of Rugrats in Paris: The Movie, in which Rugrats clips are seen.

Use in sporting events
The first use of the song at an American sporting event was at Mississippi State University. The university's mascot is the Bulldog, and the university school first played the song during football games in the fall of 1998 using the version sung by Chuck Smooth. It was accompanied by the crowd singing along and the team performing a dance on the field called "The Dawg Pound Rock" just before a kickoff. Later the Southeastern Conference ruled that they could not perform the dance on the field, so the team moved it to the sidelines. Several other teams followed suit, and the song quickly became a national phenomenon.

In June 2000, Gregg Greene, then Director of Promotions for the Seattle Mariners, was the first to play the Baha Men's version of "Who Let the Dogs Out" at a Major League Baseball game. He debuted the tune as a joke for the team's backup catcher, Joe Oliver. Two days later, shortstop Alex Rodriguez requested the song be used as his walk-up music, and it quickly became the Mariners team anthem. The Baha Men performed at Safeco Field during a Mariners game in September 2000. The New York Mets, however, have claimed that they were the first MLB team to adopt the song, to which ESPN humorously commented "This is a little like scientists arguing over who discovered a deadly virus". The Baha Men recorded a version of the song that changed the chorus to "Who let the Mets out?" and all the lyrics to reflect the team and its players, which was played at Shea Stadium throughout the Mets' 2000 postseason run, including a live performance on the Shea Stadium field before Game 4 of the 2000 World Series against the New York Yankees. The song was written by David Brody of Z100 New York and recorded by the Baha Men initially for Z100. Brody then gave the song to the Mets to play at Shea.

In the United Kingdom, the song was quickly appropriated by Liverpool supporters under then-manager Gérard Houllier. Regular chants of 'Hou led the reds out' by Liverpool fans (a reference to Liverpool's cup treble in 2001) were followed soon after by opposition fans' chants of 'Hou had a heart attack' (a reference to Houllier's illness in October 2001).

Charts and certifications

Weekly charts

Year-end charts

Certifications

Notes

References

External links
  "How a missing Wikipedia entry for Who Let the Dogs Out led to a nine-year hunt for answers", CBC Radio, April 25, 2019
 

1999 songs
2000 singles
Baha Men songs
Number-one singles in Australia
Number-one singles in New Zealand
UK Independent Singles Chart number-one singles
Soca songs
Grammy Award for Best Dance Recording
Songs written for films
Songs with feminist themes
Miami bass songs
Songs about dogs